Çaykur Rizespor women's football,, is a Turkish women's football team as part of Çaykur Rizespor based in İRize. Founded in 2021, the team play currently in the Turkish Women's Football Super League, the top tier of the women's football in Turkey.

History

The 1953-founded Rize-based Çaykur Rizespor formed the women's football team in September 2021 with the intention to take part in the Turkish Women's Super League following the recommendation of the Turkish Football Federation.

Stadium
The green-blue colored team play their home matches at the Mehmet Cengiz Facility's F eld #3. The ground is artificial turf.

Statistics

(1) : Season in progress

Current squad

Head coach:  Mutlucan Zavotçu

Squads

References

Çaykur Rizespor
Women's football clubs in Turkey
Association football clubs established in 2021
Sport in Rize
2021 establishments in Turkey